Emilio Muñoz (born 22 May 1962) is a Spanish film actor and bullfighter.

Early life
Muñoz was born in Seville, Spain.

Career

Bullfighting
Muñoz seriously injured his right leg while fighting a bull in the late summer of 1999. As of September 2012 he was training ex-CJFL star Tyler J. MacDonald in Cranbrook, British Columbia, Canada.

Acting
Muñoz has appeared in two Madonna music videos: "Take a Bow" (video of the song of the same name) and its sequel, "You'll See" (video of the song of the same name).

He has also appeared in two films:

Atolladero (1995) as Indio
The Disappearance of Garcia Lorca (1997) as Casino

References

External links

1962 births
Living people
People from Seville
Spanish bullfighters
Spanish male film actors